{{DISPLAYTITLE:C11H18O}}
The molecular formula C11H18O (molar mass: 166.26 g/mol, exact mass: 166.1358 u) may refer to:

 Dihydrojasmone
 Pomarose

Molecular formulas